Mike Winter (born 16 August 1974) is a Canadian equestrian. He competed at the 2004 Summer Olympics and the 2008 Summer Olympics.

References

External links
 

1974 births
Living people
Canadian male equestrians
Olympic equestrians of Canada
Equestrians at the 2004 Summer Olympics
Equestrians at the 2008 Summer Olympics
Pan American Games medalists in equestrian
Pan American Games silver medalists for Canada
Equestrians at the 2003 Pan American Games
Equestrians at the 2007 Pan American Games
Sportspeople from Montreal
Medalists at the 2003 Pan American Games
Medalists at the 2007 Pan American Games
21st-century Canadian people
20th-century Canadian people